The Julesburg Advocate is a weekly newspaper in Julesburg, Colorado, published by Prairie Mountain Publishing, a unit of MediaNews Group.

External links
Newspaper website

Newspapers published in Colorado
Sedgwick County, Colorado